Ender's Game is a series of comic book adaptations of a series of science fiction novels of the same name written by Orson Scott Card and published by Marvel Comics that began in October 2008. However, some have new content never before released in the novels. The series, like the novels they are based on, is set in a future where mankind is facing annihilation by an aggressive alien society, an insect-like race known colloquially as "Buggers" but more formally as "Formics". The central character, Andrew "Ender" Wiggin, is one of the child soldiers trained at Battle School (and eventually Command School) to be the future leaders of the protection of Earth. The year is never specified, although the ages of the Wiggin children are bound to change throughout space, taking in the relativity of space and time.

Background

Format
The series of comic books are adaptations of the novels in the Ender Saga and are released under the banner "Actual Ender's Game". The series began publication in October 2008 with the first issue of Ender's Game: Battle School, with a set monthly release that followed. Both Ender's Game and Ender's Shadow stories were told spanning ten issues each, with two different sub-titles. Orson Scott Card's name has been attached to every issue released. Though he himself has not written any of the issues thus far, he does look over all that is published.

Titles

Gold Bug
An adaptation of Orson Scott Card's short story The Gold Bug, first published in Card's webzine InterGalactic Medicine Show, was released on March 17, 2007, as a bonus with the purchase of the hardcover edition of the comic adaptation Red Prophet: The Tales of Alvin Maker.

Ender's Game: Battle School
A five-part series based on Ender's Game. The first issue was released October 2008. There's a war coming. The same aliens who almost destroyed Earth once are coming back to get the whole job done this time. But we aren't going to just sit and die. The international military is taking our best and brightest to mold them into the finest military minds ever - and they're taking them young. 6-year-old Ender Wiggin is the best they've ever found, Can he save the Earth?

Ender's Shadow: Battle School
A five-part series based on Ender's Shadow. A mysterious, tiny orphan on the streets of Rotterdam, thought to be not worth a bean, will change the world. There's only one student at Battle School smarter than Ender Wiggin - Bean

Ender's Game: Command School
A five-part series that picks up where Ender's Game: Battle School left off. Ender Wiggin may be the only hope that humanity has against an alien race that threatens Earth with annihilation. He's been given his own army, and now commands 40 soldiers in a series of war games in preparation for invasion... and he's only nine years old! The classic sci-fi story heads to its incredible conclusion as Ender takes control of Dragon Army. But Ender is quickly realizing that the aliens may not be his true enemy in Battle School... his Teachers are!

Ender's Shadow: Command School
A five-part series that picks up where Ender's Shadow: Battle School left off. With time running out for the human race, Bean is assigned to Dragon army under the command of the legendary Ender Wiggin. But their relationship is a bruising clash of egos and agendas from the start - and it only gets worse when Dragon face their first battle.

Recruiting Valentine
Released June 2009, this one-shot is the first in all new content not released in novel format. Ender Wiggin may be in space learning to fight Formics, but his older siblings Peter and Valentine are saving the world back on Earth. When Valentine learns of an injustice in her school, she wants to fight it. Enter Peter who guides his sister through the process of nonviolent influence, and sets the ball rolling for his plans to one day rule the world. Jake Black, writer of the upcoming Ender's Game Companion, adds this previously untold story to the Ender's Universe.

War of Gifts
Released December 2009, this one-shot is based on the novel of the same name, taking place during the events of Ender's Game and Ender's Shadow. Zeck Morgan was raised by his minister father to be a pious, God-fearing child, devoted to his church. Unfortunately, when the International Fleet decides Zeck is a candidate for training in Battle School, they tear him from his home and prepare him for war. Zeck refuses to participate in the school's war-games due to his pacifist religious beliefs. When he sees a Dutch student give a friend a small present in celebration of Saint Nicholas' Eve —seemingly violating Battle School's rules against religious practice—he raises an uproar that may tear Battle School apart. Can even Ender Wiggin calm this furor?

Mazer in Prison
Released February 2010, this is a one-shot prequel based on the short story of the same name. Mazer Rackham, the only man ever to defeat the Formics, takes on a new enemy... the International Fleet itself. Burdened with careerists and bureaucrats, the I.F. is doomed to fail in the coming war, and only Rackham, with the help a young Hyrum Graff, can rid the I.F. of its old guard and pave the way for Earth's next great commander.

The League War 
Released April 2010, Ender Wiggin is not the only genius child to influence the course of Earth's history. Not even the only one in his family. After the end of the final Formic War, the nations of the Earth are scrambling for power...and Peter and Valentine Wiggin, Ender's older and equally intelligent siblings, will start and end a world war with nothing more than words. This one-shot follow-up to Ender's Game fills in new detail between the pages of the multiple Hugo Award-winning Ender Wiggin series by Orson Scott Card.

Ender in Exile
Five-part series released from June–October 2010. The direct sequel to Ender's Game. Thirteen-year-old Ender Wiggin has saved mankind from an alien threat. His reward? Exile. Branded a monster by those who feel threatened by his military genius, Ender is suddenly a hero without a home. Consumed with guilt, Ender must face his own demons and the people who are bent on stripping him of power. Based on the bestselling novel of the same name by Orson Scott Card.

Speaker for the Dead
Five-part series released from January–May 2011. Ender Wiggin was twelve years old when he destroyed an alien race. Burdened with guilt, he wrote Speaker for the Dead and created a pseudo-religion that spanned the known worlds. Now an adult, Ender is called to investigate a murder committed by a new alien species with a seemingly gruesome nature. Can Ender uncover the truth before another species and more human lives are lost? Based on the award-winning novel by Orson Scott Card.

Formic Wars: Burning Earth
Seven-part series released from February–July 2011. The story is said to be the second story in the comics to not be based on either a novel or short story, making it all new content. (The first to have all new content was Recruiting Valentine, see above.) Ender Wiggin may have ended humanity's war with the Formic race in the novel Ender's Game, but the fight to squash the bugs began long before the battle strategist even took his first baby steps. Now for the first time ever, fans finally get to see how the Ender Saga first began with the seven-issue limited series.

Formic Wars: Silent Strike
Five-part series released from December 2011–April 2012. The story is not based on a novel or short story, making it all new content. With 44 million people killed by the toxic gas that the alien Formics unleashed in China, the only hope of a counter-agent lies with Mazer Rackham and the Mobile Operations Police safely retrieving a sample. Meanwhile, young asteroid miner Victor Delgado has snuck aboard the Formic mother ship in hopes of taking it down alone...and boy is he in for a big disappointment.

Chronological order of series

As with the novels the comics do have a correct timeline in which each story takes place:

 Formic Wars: Burning Earth
 Formic Wars: Silent Strike
 Mazer in Prison
 Ender's Game: Battle School/Ender's Shadow: Battle School
 Recruiting Valentine
 War of Gifts
 Ender's Game: Command School/Ender's Shadow: Command School
 The League War
 Ender in Exile
 Gold Bug
 Speaker for the Dead

Collected editions
Gold Bug appears in the hardcover edition of Red Prophet: The Tales of Alvin Maker.

See also
List of Ender's Game characters
List of works by Orson Scott Card
Ender's Game (series)

References

External links

Comics based on novels
Comics